Paragordius varius is a parasite species in the horsehair worm group (Nematomorpha). They cycle between terrestrial and aquatic habitats and are most commonly known for their ability to manipulate their definitive host to jump into a pool of water, which allows them to complete their life cycle. Adults are over 10 cm long and 400 μm in diameter. P. varius is usually found in water or wet areas. The definitive hosts are mainly terrestrial arthropods, most often carabid beetles, crickets and praying mantids.

Morphology 
Paragordius varius have a slightly off-center mouth and distinct grooves running along its cylindrical body. Male worms can grow to be 12–29 cm in length whereas females are generally longer and can grow to be 12–31 cm in length. This parasite is a pseudocoelomate whose body consists of an areole containing cuticle layer, monolayer hypoderm, muscular layer, ventral nerve cord and a digestive tract.

Life cycle and reproduction
The life cycle of P. varius includes a terrestrial and an aquatic stage. Adults worms emerge from their insect hosts late spring or summer. They swim in the shallow waters in search for a mate. Upon encounter, the female signals to the male that she is ready and willing to mate. No penetration occurs during copulation and the male releases his sperm immediately. However, if the sperm does not land on the appropriate posterior area of the female, conception will fail. Once the sperm lands, a large circular glob forms which passes into the seminal receptacle of the female within twenty four hours of mating. Upon conception, the female P. varius lays a long, white, string of eggs and dies. Up to as six million eggs are produced by a single female. Eggs are released into the water where they hatch into larvae. The larvae infect larvae of aquatic insects and snails that serve as paratenic hosts. In these they encyst after 5–14 days. As cysts they can survive the host's metamorphosis and wait for the host to be consumed by a definitive host. In the definitive host, development takes approximately 30 days. After 25 days of infection differences between males and females can be seen. Around the same time the gonads probably start to differentiate between the sexes.

Development 
The life cycle of nematomorphs has 4 stages: First is the egg, which takes about 10–12 days to complete its larval development after being laid. Second is the pre-parasitic larva that hatches from the egg; the fully developed larva remains in the egg 7–10 days before hatching. Third is the parasitic larva that develops within an invertebrate host; larvae swim about freely in the water after hatching, and are ingested with water when insects drink. If the larvae does not find a host within a few days, they will die. The larvae uses hooks on the anterior portions of the body to infect its host. Once inside a host insect, the larva penetrate the insect's gut and enter its body cavity and forms a cyst in the muscular or intestine region. They mature and escape from the host in two to three months. When the intermediate host completes metamorphosis it comes across a definitive host and evolves into an adult. The final stage of the nematomorphs is the free-living aquatic adult; the development only takes about thirty days where the P. varius is able to produce three generations in one year. They break through the body wall of the host and become free-living. Eventually the P. varius will leave the definitive host when the host is near water. This is done by manipulating its host to migrate to a shallow body of water.

Host species 
This parasite is known to infect insect species in the order orthoptera. Amongst the host species are grasshoppers, crickets, cockroaches, snails, mosquito larvae, or other small aquatic animals and insects. Mammals are not capable of being infected. However, dogs, cats, and even humans have been known to swallow adult worms accidentally.

Host manipulation
Like many horsehair worms, P. varius can alter its host's behaviour. It does this at least in two distinct ways. 

In the definitive cricket (Acheta domesticus) host P. varius can reduce the time spent calling of males. Male crickets call to attract females, but are likely to also attract predators. To reduce the risk of predation P. varius reduces the calling rate of its host.

Second, to complete its life cycle, P. varius can manipulate the behaviour of its definitive host to make the host more likely to enter a body of water.

Distribution 
Paragordius varius has been found all across North and South America ranging as far north as Canada and as far south as Argentina.  It prefers environments containing bodies of water needed for reproduction. P. varius has also been found to be able to withstand temperatures as cold as -70 °C. It can be frozen at this temperature for weeks and when it thaws out, it is still completely capable of infecting its next host.

This species prefers lakes over streams.

References 

Nematomorpha
Parasitic protostomes
Parasites of insects
Suicide-inducing parasitism
Animals described in 1851